St Mary's Church is a small Gothic Revival Anglican church located in Caheragh, near Drimoleague, County Cork, Ireland. It was completed in either 1825 or 1829. It is dedicated to Mary, mother of Jesus. It is part of the Diocese of Cork, Cloyne, and Ross.

History 
The church of St Mary was built in either 1825, or 1829. It was constructed with the aid of a grant from the Board of First Fruits, amounting to a total of IR£650. An organ was inserted in the church in 1870.

References

Notes

Sources 

 

Architecture in Ireland
Churches in the Diocese of Cork, Cloyne and Ross
19th-century Church of Ireland church buildings
Gothic Revival church buildings in the Republic of Ireland
19th-century churches in the Republic of Ireland